The Shakey's V-League 13th Season Collegiate Conference is the 26th conference of the Shakey's V-League and the second conference for its 13th season. The conference was started on July 30, 2016 at the Ynares Sports Arena with the first two games of the conference. Majority of the games will be held at the Philsports Arena, Pasig.

There are ten (10) competing teams (5 from UAAP, 4 from NCAA and 1 from ISAA) who will split into two brackets for this conference, which served as a pre-season tournament for collegiate leagues.

ABS-CBN Sports+Action is covering the games live on television.

Participating Teams

Line-ups

Group A

Group B

Format
The conference format as it follows:

Preliminaries
Single round robin preliminary

Quarterfinals
Top three teams from each group after preliminary round will enter the quarterfinal play-off round

Semifinals
Top four teams after quarterfinals round will enter the semifinals round
They will compete against each other in a best-of-three series as follows: Rank 1 vs Rank 4 and Rank 2 vs Rank 3.

Finals
Best-of-three series for the Final and Bronze matches

Players who are eligible to play in the conference are those who have been competed in a collegiate league, enrolled freshmen, and transferees who have completed their residency period. All teams are mandatory to add two guest players for each squad, including players who are still undergoing residency period.

Preliminary round

Group A

|}

Match Results
All times are Philippine Standard Time (UTC+08:00)

|}

Playoff for Quarterfinals

|}

Group B

|}

Match Results
All times are Philippine Standard Time (UTC+08:00)

|}

Quarterfinals

|}

|}

Playoff for Semifinals

|}

Semifinals
 Ranking is based from the quarter finals round.
 All series are best-of-3

Rank 1 vs Rank 4

|}

Rank 2 vs Rank 3

|}

Finals

Battle for Bronze

|}

Championship

|}

Individual awards

Final standings

See also
 Spikers' Turf 2nd Season Collegiate Conference
 2016 PSL All-Filipino Conference

References

External links
 www.v-league.ph - Official website

Shakey's V-League conferences
2016 in Philippine sport